The Heuberg, also called Rosalia, is , and thus the highest peak in the Rosalia Mountains.

Geography

Location 
The Heuberg lies on the territory of Forchtenstein in the Austrian state of Burgenland, northeast of the Hochwolkersdorf hamlet of Hollerberg and northwest of the village of Rosalienhäuser in the Forchtenstein cadastral municipality of Neustift an der Rosalia. The border with Lower Austria runs past the summit only about 150 metres to the west and south. To the northwest is the village of Heuberg in the cadastral municipality of Ofenbach in the municipality of Lanzenkirchen, where there is a forestry training centre for the University of Natural Resources and Life Sciences, Vienna. The Heuberg's neighbouring summits are the Auerberg (740 m) and the Hartlspitz (700 m) to the south. The Wulka rises on the northeastern mountainside of the Heuberg.

Geology 
Geologically the Heuberg is made of coarse gneiss. Its slopes are dominated by agricultural fields, but the summit area is wooded.

Sport 
On its southern slopes below the Rosalia Chapel is a ski and toboggan slope. In the winter, when the snow is good enough there is a roughly 150-metre-long drag lift, which is mainly used by parents with their children.

Structures 
At the top is the Rosalia Chapel, a well-known pilgrimage church. A road runs to it from the settlement of Rosalienhäuser. On the northern side of the Heuberg is the Heuberg Transmitter.

References 

Mountains under 1000 metres
Mountains of Burgenland
Mountains of the Alps
Rosalia Mountains